Jérôme Agyenim Boateng (born 3 September 1988) is a German professional footballer who plays as a centre-back for French Ligue 1 club Lyon.

Boateng started his career at Hertha BSC where he developed from the youth ranks to the first team. After his debut season at Hertha, he soon signed for Hamburger SV and established himself as an integral part of the team, helping the club reach two consecutive UEFA Europa League semi-finals. After a season in England, with Manchester City, he joined Bayern Munich in 2011 and won many domestic and European honours with the club, most notably the continental treble in the 2012–13 and 2019–20 seasons. His contract ran out on 30 June 2021 and he subsequently became a free agent before opting to sign for Lyon.

Boateng played in the Germany under-21 side which won the 2009 Euro U-21 Championship and was soon promoted to the national side. Boateng has since accumulated over 70 caps and represented Germany at UEFA Euro 2012, Euro 2016, 2010 World Cup, 2014 World Cup, and 2018 World Cup. He was a key member of his country's victory in the 2014 World Cup. 

He is the younger half-brother of fellow footballer Kevin-Prince Boateng.

Club career

Early career
Boateng started his career with the youth team of Tennis Borussia Berlin, before joining Hertha BSC in 2002.

Hertha BSC
After emerging from the youth team set-up, he played for the reserves for two seasons. He scored one goal in nine appearances in the 2005–06 season and made 15 appearances in the 2006–07 season. He won a call-up to the first-team squad on 31 January 2007. He made his debut against Hannover 96 in the AWD-Arena, during week 19 of the 2006–07 Bundesliga season. He then became a first-team regular, despite being barely 18 years of age. He finished the 2006–07 season with 11 appearances for the first team.

Boateng was linked with a move to Hamburger SV in the summer of 2007. Because of this, according to the German media, Boateng did not want to sign a five-year professional contract with Hertha.

Hamburger SV

Boateng moved to Hamburg on 22 August 2007 for a fee said to be around €1.1 million. Boateng spent two successful years at Hamburg, where he would go on to become an important part of the side's defence in the 2008–09 season which saw Hamburg in the race for the Bundesliga title, as well as reaching the semi-finals of the UEFA Europa League in both his years at the club. He had made 37 appearances during the 2007–08 season. and 35 appearances during the 2008–09 season. In the 2009–10 season, he broke into the Germany national side after impressing for Hamburg, earning himself a place in the squad for the 2010 FIFA World Cup. He finished the 2009–10 season with a goal in 41 appearances.

Manchester City
On 5 June 2010, English Premier League club Manchester City confirmed the transfer of Boateng to the English club for £10.4 million on a five-year deal, where he wore his favoured number 17 shirt. He made his City debut in a pre-season friendly against Valencia for the first half, alternating between centre-back and right-back with Micah Richards. After an impressive run, down the right flank, he provided the assisting cross for Gareth Barry to score.

During the week prior to the start of the 2010–11 Premier League season, Boateng suffered an injury setback on international duty with Germany during a friendly against Denmark. He tore a tendon in his left knee, which was then aggravated on the plane home after a collision with a drinks trolley.

He made his debut for Manchester City with a substitute appearance during a 1–0 victory against Chelsea on 25 September 2010. He followed this with a first competitive start in a 1–1 Europa League draw with Juventus, playing at right-back. In his one season with City, Boateng made 24 appearances. He also won the 2010–11 FA Cup despite not being a member of the matchday squad for the final.

Bayern Munich

2011–12 season

In June 2011, Boateng expressed his desire to leave Manchester City for Bayern Munich, stating that playing for Bayern would help his chances of playing regularly for the Germany national team and that he was frustrated at having to play almost exclusively at right-back.

On 14 July 2011, Bayern confirmed the transfer of Boateng to the German club for a fee of €13.5 million on a four-year deal. He was given the same number 17 shirt he wore at Manchester City and for most of his time with Hamburg. He made his debut on 27 July 2011 as a second-half substitute for Rafinha during the 2011 Audi Cup in a match against Milan. His Bundesliga debut for Bayern came in a 0–1 home defeat against Borussia Mönchengladbach, on 6 August; an error between himself and fellow new signing goalkeeper Manuel Neuer allowed Igor de Camargo to score the only goal. The team finished the season as runners-up in the Bundesliga, DFB-Pokal and Champions League, with Boateng playing the finals of the latter two tournaments in their entirety. He made 48 appearances during the 2011–12 season.

2012–13 season

During the 2012–13 season, Boateng was a regular member of the Bayern team that won a treble of the Bundesliga, DFB-Pokal and Champions League, in addition to the DFL-Supercup at the start of the season. On 5 December 2012, Boateng picked up a red card against BATE Borisov which resulted in a two-match ban. He scored his first Bundesliga goal with a header from Phillip Lahm's cross on 9 March 2013, the winner as Bayern came from behind for a 3–2 home win against Fortuna Düsseldorf. He netted a second on 13 April, an acrobatic half-volley to open a 5–0 home win over 1. FC Nürnberg, after Bayern had already won the league title. He scored two goals in 40 appearances during the 2012–13 season.

2013–14 season
On 2 October 2013, Boateng picked up a red card against former club Manchester City which resulted in a one-match ban in the Champions League. His only league goal of the season was on 9 November, finishing a corner after four minutes of a 3–0 home win over FC Augsburg. He extended his contract with Bayern on 11 December, which will keep him at the club until 2018. On 3 May 2014, Boateng picked up a red card which resulted in a two-match ban. Bayern ended the season as winners of a domestic double of the Bundesliga and DFB-Pokal. He scored a goal in 43 appearances during the 2013–14 season.

2014–15 season
On 17 September 2014, Boateng scored his first European goal for Bayern in the 2014–15 Champions League season with a strike which was the only goal in the opening group stage match against his former club Manchester City. Boateng picked up a red card against Schalke 04 on 3 February 2015 which resulted in a three-match ban in the Bundesliga.

Boateng scored in a 7–0 Champions League round of 16 win against Shakhtar Donetsk on 11 March 2015, and in a 6–1 quarter-final win over Porto on 21 April. He finished the 2014–15 season three goals in 44 appearances.

2015–16 season
Boateng started the 2015–16 season by playing in the German Super Cup. He picked up a red card against 1899 Hoffenheim on 22 August 2015. On 18 December, Boateng signed a new contract with Bayern, keeping him at the club until 2021. He finished the 2015–16 season with 31 appearances.

2016–17 season
On 20 December 2016, Boateng suffered pectoral muscle tendon and was out for almost three months. On 11 March 2017, Boateng made his return after 108 days as a substitute by replacing Javi Martínez in the 64th minute in a 3–0 victory over Eintracht Frankfurt. On 14 April 2017, head coach Carlo Ancelotti confirmed that Boateng was ruled out of the away match in the league against Bayer Leverkusen due to adductor problem. He made his return on 20 May 2017, Boateng sustained muscle injury and was subbed off just after 11 minutes in the last match of the season where Bayern won 4–1 against SC Freiburg. He finished the 2016–17 season with 21 appearances.

2017–18 season
On 13 September 2017, Boateng made his comeback after 115 days on the sidelines in the Champions League match and provided one assist to Joshua Kimmich's late goal after being subbed on in a 3–0 victory over Anderlecht. On 21 December, Boateng scored a header in a 2–1 win as his side knocked their fierce rival Borussia Dortmund out of the DFB-Pokal during the round of 16 match. On 27 January 2018, Boateng scored another header in the league match and his first league goal since November 2013 as his side made a comeback from two goal behind to finish the game with a 5–2 victory over 1899 Hoffenheim. Boateng made his 250th appearance for the club in a 6–0 victory over Hamburg on 10 March. On 11 April, Boateng and his teammate Thomas Müller made their 100th European appearance in the Champions League match against Sevilla as the game finished 0–0 draw. On 26 April, Boateng suffered thigh muscle injury during the Champions League semi-final first leg match against Real Madrid in which the game ended 2–1 loss for his sides and the injury made him miss all the remaining matches of the season. He finished the 2017–18 season with two goals in 31 appearances.

2018–19 season
Boateng entered the season injury-free and started the season strong as he played every minute of Bayern's first three Bundesliga matches. During the first half of the season, Boateng was rotated along with Bayern's other two centre-backs, Mats Hummels and Niklas Süle. Boateng lost his place in the starting lineup as Bayern's coach, Niko Kovač, decided that Hummels and Süle were his first option. After the winter break, Boateng was linked to other clubs as he was reported to be unhappy with his position at Bayern.

On 18 May 2019, Boateng won his seventh consecutive Bundesliga title as Bayern finished two points above Dortmund with 78 points. A week later, Boateng won his fourth DFB-Pokal as Bayern defeated RB Leipzig 3–0 in the 2019 DFB-Pokal Final. Boateng did not appear in the match as he was an unused substitute. He finished the 2018–19 season without scoring in 28 appearances.

2019–20 season
On 14 December 2019, Boateng made his 300th appearance for Bayern in a match against Werder Bremen.

Boateng also regained his place in the starting XI, often partnering up with David Alaba, after Niklas Süle suffered a long-term injury in October 2019 and Bayern's new signing Lucas Hernandez suffered from minor injuries. He regained his form in this season and performed very well, completing his second continental treble.

2020–21 season
On 3 November 2020, Boateng scored his first goal of the season in a 6–2 away win over Red Bull Salzburg in the Champions League.

In April 2021, Bayern's sporting director Hasan Salihamidžić stated that Boateng's contract would expire in the summer and would not be extended.

Lyon 
On 1 September 2021, Boateng joined French side Lyon on a free transfer. He signed a contract until 30 June 2023.

International career

Boateng has played for the German under-17 and under-19 national teams. On 5 July 2007 he was called up to the German under-19 squad by coach Frank Engel for the 2007 UEFA European Under-19 Championship held in Austria, from 16 July until 27 July.

Boateng is also a former Germany under-21 international and won with the team the 2009 UEFA European Under-21 Championship. He made his debut with the Germany senior team on 10 October 2009 against Russia, becoming the first German international to get sent off on his debut; he received a second booking in the second half. Despite this shaky start, he was called up regularly ever since.

2010 FIFA World Cup
Boateng was included in Joachim Löw's final 23-man squad for the 2010 World Cup in South Africa.

On 23 June 2010, Boateng played for Germany against his half-brother; Kevin-Prince who represents Ghana. The game ended in a 1–0 victory for Germany. It was the first time that two brothers played on opposite teams at the FIFA World Cup.

Boateng started his second straight game as Germany beat England 4–1, and Argentina 4–0 in the quarter-final, as well as the 1–0 loss to Spain in the semi-final.

Boateng featured in the third-place game against Uruguay. He aided Germany to a 3–2 win by providing the assist for Germany's second goal by Marcell Jansen, helping to secure third place at a second straight World Cup.

UEFA Euro 2012
Boateng was included in Germany's 23-man squad for Euro 2012. He played at right-back and featured in four of their five matches as the nation reached the semi-final, but were eliminated by Italy.

2014 FIFA World Cup

Boateng and his brother played against each other again four years later during the next World Cup, when Ghana and Germany were once again drawn in the same group. On 8 July 2014, Boateng played the full match for Germany in their record-breaking 7–1 semi-final defeat of Brazil.

On 13 July 2014, Boateng won the 2014 World Cup with Germany after they defeated Argentina 1–0 in the final. He played a central role in Germany's victory in the final, winning 83% of his duels and making several good tackles alongside teammate Mats Hummels, while only committing 1 foul throughout the entire 120 minutes. Several media sources named him as man of the match, although the official man of the match was Mario Götze.

UEFA Euro 2016
On 13 June 2016, Boateng made a vital goal-line clearance which denied Ukraine to score a goal as the match ended in a  2–0 victory for the Germans in their first group stage match. On 26 June, Boateng scored his first international goal in the round of 16 match against Slovakia, opening the scoring with a long-range volley in the 3–0 victory. On 8 July, Boateng was subbed off in the second half as he suffered thigh muscle injury during the semi-final match against France and the match ended 2–0 loss for Germany.

2018 FIFA World Cup
Boateng was named in Joachim Löw's final 23-man squad for the 2018 FIFA World Cup on 4 June 2018. On 23 June, Boateng was sent off after receiving a second yellow card during their second group stage match against Sweden, but that didn't stop Germany winning the game with 2–1 victory. He also became the first German player to be sent off in a World Cup match since Miroslav Klose against Serbia in the 2010 World Cup. However, he was eliminated after Germany suffered a 0–2 shock defeat to South Korea, thus Germany were eliminated from the tournament.

On 5 March 2019, national team coach Joachim Löw confirmed that he would plan without Boateng for the foreseeable future, along with his club teammates Mats Hummels and Thomas Müller.

Style of play
A versatile defender, Boateng primarily is a centre-back, although he can also play as a right-back. Physically strong and composed in possession, he has gained a reputation as a tough-tackling defender, with good passing and an ability to read the game. Despite his talent in his youth, he was initially accused by certain pundits of being error-prone defensively; however, he later came to be considered one of the world's best players in his position.

Personal life

Boateng is a Ghanaian German, born to a German mother named Martina Boateng and a Ghanaian father in Berlin. He is the younger, paternal half-brother of fellow professional footballer Kevin-Prince Boateng. He also has an elder brother, George, who played for the youth sides at Hertha BSC but did not become a professional player.

Boateng was in a long-term relationship with Sherin Senler, with whom he has twin daughters. The pair separated for a couple of years but reunited in November 2013, to only have an on-off relationship. Boateng allegedly had an affair with model Gina-Lisa Lohfink, which both Boateng and Lohfink have denied. He had a son in 2015.

In 2019, Boateng began a relationship with Polish-born model Kasia Lenhardt. In February 2021, following a public spat between the two after Lenhardt crashed Boateng's Mini Cooper and was charged with driving under the influence, Boateng announced the two were separating. Their relationship had already become publicly sour, with Boateng accusing the model of sabotaging a previous relationship and blackmailing him to stay with her. On 10 February, one week after the confirmed breakup, Lenhardt was found dead in an apartment in Berlin, with investigators believing the cause of death to be suicide. Boateng, who was in Qatar playing in the FIFA Club World Cup with Bayern Munich at the time, was then confirmed to have departed the country due to personal reasons by the club.

Boateng is engaged to long time off/on again girlfriend Rebecca Silvera.

Assault charge
On 9 September 2021, in a German court in Munich, Boateng was found guilty of assaulting his ex-girlfriend, Sherin Senler, while on holiday in the Caribbean in 2018 and was sentenced to 60 days (daily fine in lieu of jail time, calculated from the rate of income). The daily fine was set to €30,000 and Boateng therefore ordered to pay a fine of €1.8 million (£1.5 million). The Munich District Court imposed the highest possible financial damages for the domestic violence conviction on Boateng, who had denied the allegations of abuse.
Both Boateng and the district attorney appealed the verdict. On 2 November 2022, the appeals court revised the sentence to 120 days. A sentence of 90 days or more is considered a criminal conviction in Germany. The daily fine was adjusted to Boateng's current income and therefore lowered to €10,000, which results in a lower total fine of €1.2 million.

Career statistics

Club

International

Germany score listed first, score column indicates score after each Boateng goal

Honours
Manchester City	
 FA Cup: 2010–11

Bayern Munich
Bundesliga: 2012–13, 2013–14, 2014–15, 2015–16, 2016–17, 2017–18, 2018–19, 2019–20, 2020–21
DFB-Pokal: 2012–13, 2013–14, 2015–16, 2018–19, 2019–20
DFL-Supercup: 2012, 2020
UEFA Champions League: 2012–13, 2019–20
UEFA Super Cup: 2013, 2020
FIFA Club World Cup: 2013, 2020

Germany U21
UEFA European Under-21 Championship: 2009

Germany
FIFA World Cup: 2014; third place: 2010

Individual
Fritz Walter Medal U19 Bronze: 2007
Silbernes Lorbeerblatt: 2010, 2014
 Classification as world class in the kicker Ranking of German Football: Winter 2014/15, Winter 2015/16, Summer 2016
Bundesliga Team of the Season: 2014–15, 2015–16
: 2014–15, 2015–16 
UEFA European Championship Team of the Tournament: 2016
Germany Footballer of the year: 2015–16
: 2016
UEFA Team of the Year: 2016

References

External links

  
 Profile at the Olympique Lyonnais website
 
 
 
 
 
 kicker profile
 

1988 births
Living people
Footballers from Berlin
German footballers
Germany youth international footballers
Germany under-21 international footballers
Germany international footballers
Association football defenders
Tennis Borussia Berlin players
Hertha BSC II players
Hertha BSC players
Hamburger SV players
Manchester City F.C. players
FC Bayern Munich footballers
Olympique Lyonnais players
Regionalliga players
Bundesliga players
Premier League players
Ligue 1 players
UEFA Champions League winning players
2010 FIFA World Cup players
UEFA Euro 2012 players
2014 FIFA World Cup players
UEFA Euro 2016 players
2018 FIFA World Cup players
FIFA World Cup-winning players
German expatriate footballers
Expatriate footballers in England
Expatriate footballers in France
German expatriate sportspeople in England
German expatriate sportspeople in France
German sportspeople of Ghanaian descent
People convicted of domestic violence